La sposa occidentale (The western bride) is an album by the Italian singer-songwriter Lucio Battisti. It was released in  September 1990 by CBS.

The album was Italy's 34th best selling album in 1990.

Track listing 
All lyrics written by Pasquale Panella, all music composed by Lucio Battisti.
 "Tu non ti pungi più" (You Don't Prick Yourself Anymore) – 5:14
 "Potrebbe essere sera" (It Could Be Evening) – 5:16
 "Timida molto audace" (Shy and Very Bold) – 5:15
 "La sposa occidentale" (The Western Bride) – 5:39
 "Mi riposa" (It Rests Me) – 6:01
 "I ritorni" (The Returns) – 5:28
 "Alcune noncuranze" (Some Carelessnesses) – 6:36
 "Campati in aria" (Far-fetched) – 4:57

References

1990 albums
Lucio Battisti albums
Columbia Records albums